The New Normal is the first studio album by Australian rock band Cog, released on April 12, 2005 by Difrnt Music. The album was produced in Weed, California by Sylvia Massy (Tool, System of a Down, Spiderbait). The New Normal was made the album of the week on Triple J and at the J Award of 2005, the album was nominated for Australian Album of the Year.

The album peaked at number 19 on the Australian Recording Industry Association album chart.

Background
The album name was formulated in the wake of the September 11 attacks, front man Flynn Gower explained that the name was derived from a social commentator in the United States that was describing "what people once considered ‘normal’ in terms of lifestyle. Things had changed quite drastically in a short period of time. They were calling the kind of social and political environment in which we now lived, ‘the new normal’”.

In September 2004 Cog met with  Sylvia Massy in Weed, California to begin recording for the album.  The album was recorded between September, 2004 and October, 2004 at Radiostar Studios, a retired 1930s art deco theater that, according to the band, helped them get into a "different head space" for recording.

"Real Life", "My Enemy", "Run" and "Resonate" were released as radio singles in February, March and August 2005 as well as March 2006, respectively. "Real Life" was first released as a demo in late 2003, as part of Big Day Out's 2004 compilation. It was also the first song from the album to debut on the radio. The single itself was distributed to radio stations, street team members, as well as directly to some attendees of the Big Day Out '04 launch ceremony in Sydney, Australia at Utopia Records on April 9, 2005. "My Enemy" was included in the Triple J Hottest 100: Volume 13 compilation album released in March, 2006 while "Run" was later featured in Triple J Hottest 100 Australian Albums Of All Time released in July, 2011.

Lyrics and themes
Lyrically the album focuses heavily to articulate themes of new world globalization in conjunction with government corruption and control. Flynn Gower described the lyrics as " recurring ideas of anger, alienation, isolation, dissension, disillusionment and disempowerment" as well as the feeling of exclusion from "the decision-making process" on both the local and national level. He went on to state that the album conveys "universal themes" that would express the feelings of Australians and people across the world who feel they need to "take the power back".

Artwork
Various items of "modern protest" were featured within the panels of the digipack release including: a brick, lit torch, gas mask, cell phone, laptop and Molotov cocktail. The gas mask and Molotov cocktail included specific descriptions of the peripherals followed by notes on how they could be used as "identity concealment devices" and for "guerilla warfare", respectively. Commenting on the protest theme, art director Daniel Parkinson stated "we decided on a clean stark look, using Times New Roman Font like a newspaper" in addition to "some strange 'anomaly' objects" portrayed as black balls floating above the desert floor. Furthermore, the front cover features an electric megaphone in accordance to the "modern protest" theme as well as "cog the new normal" in Braille. Flynn Gower stated the "starkness of the message" was "very clear and easy to decipher."

Reception

The New Normal was mostly well received and gained generally positive reviews, but was not without its criticisms. Jody Macgregor of AllMusic said  "Flynn Gower...sings with enough genuineness and passion to deliver political songs...without sounding trite." She described some of the rhymes as "a touch too obvious" while "[pushing] a simplistic melody...longer than it deserves", but assures "enough unexpected turns and blistering riffs" to conclude that  "Cog are at their best concocting these apocalyptic epics".

The album entered the ARIA Charts on April 24, 2005, peaked at #19 and remained on the chart for three weeks. Moreover, the album was described by Triple J radio as "Australian heavy music fans have been holding out for" as well as "a massive sound, almost unbelievable for that of a three piece band." In 2005 the album was nominated for the J Award by Triple J.

Track listing
All songs written, composed and performed by Cog.

Charts

Personnel
Cog
Flynn Gower – lead vocals, guitar
Lucius Borich – drums, backing vocals, samples
Luke Gower – bass guitar, backing vocals

Production
Cog – producer, album design
Sylvia Massy – producer, mixing
Rich Veltrop – co-producer, engineer, mixing
Kale Holmes – mixing
Cecil Gregory – studio assistant
Seabrian Arata – Pro Tools editor
Tom Baker – mastering
Sean Boucher – recording & engineering (pre-production)
Daniel Parkinson – art direction, graphic design, photography
Andrzej Liguz – group photography

References

2005 debut albums
Albums produced by Sylvia Massy
Cog (band) albums